City Assembly elections were held in Podgorica, the capital of Montenegro, on 27 May 2018. Parties and coalitions ran for 61 seats in the Assembly, with 3% election threshold required to win seats.

Electoral system
Voters in Podgorica determine the composition of the City Assembly, which in turn elects the Mayor. This means that the Mayor is only indirectly elected by the voters. Only parties which reach an electoral threshold of 3% may enter the Assembly. The Mayor may or may not be a councilor of the Assembly. Assembly's composition is subject to a 4-year election cycle.

Electoral lists
The following are the electoral lists proclaimed by the Capital City Electoral Commission:

Campaign
Democratic Montenegro (DCG) and United Reform Action (URA) decided to run together under the name the "Podgorica for 21st century", with DCG member Vladimir Čađenović as ballot carrier.

Social Democratic Party (SDP) decided to form a pre-election alliance with Democratic Alliance (DEMOS) under the name the "Civic Alliance for Changes", with SDP member Ivan Vujović as ballot carrier.

Bosniak Party (BS) decided to sign an agreement with ruling Democratic Party of Socialists (DPS) and Liberal Party (LP), as did the Montenegrin (CRN), Positive Montenegro (PCG) and Democratic Union of Albanians (DUA), with university professor Ivan Vuković as ballot carrier, while the current Mayor Migo Stijepović took second place on electoral list.

Social Democrats (SD) decided to run independently under the slogan "Consistently for Podgorica", with current president of Podgorica City Assembly Đorđe Suhih as ballot carrier.

Socialist People's Party (SNP) and Democratic Front (DF) agreed to form a pre-election local alliance under the slogan "Everything for my City", with DF member and MP Slaven Radunović as ballot carrier.

Results

Vote share

Seats

References

2018 in Montenegro
2018 elections in Europe
2018
May 2018 events in Europe